Silvio Berti (31 January 1856 – 29 July 1930) was an Italian freemason, politician and lawyer. He was the 7th mayor of Florence.

References

1856 births
1930 deaths
People from Rocca San Casciano
19th-century Italian politicians
20th-century Italian politicians
20th-century Italian lawyers
Italian Freemasons
Mayors of Florence